The Büttner Easy Plane is a German paramotor that was designed by Gerald Büttner and produced by Büttner Propeller of Obernkirchen for powered paragliding. Now out of production, when it was available the aircraft was supplied complete and ready-to-fly.

Design and development
The Easy Plane was designed to comply with the US FAR 103 Ultralight Vehicles rules as well as European regulations. It features a paraglider-style wing, single-place accommodation and a single   Solo engine in pusher configuration with a 2.85:1 ratio reduction drive and a  diameter Büttner Propeller-designed  propeller.

As is the case with all paramotors, take-off and landing is accomplished by foot. Inflight steering is accomplished via handles that actuate the canopy brakes, creating roll and yaw.

Specifications (Easy Plane)

References

Easy Plane
2000s German ultralight aircraft
Single-engined pusher aircraft
Paramotors